Indiana NORML is the National Organization for the Reform of Marijuana Laws (NORML) affiliate for the U.S. state of Indiana. As of 2020, William Henry served as chairman of Indiana NORML.

History

Media and activism
In January 2020, Indiana NORML stepped up its grassroots efforts with over 3,000 volunteers in 70 counties. They also hosted the first congressional cannabis debate in Indiana.

See also
 List of cannabis organizations
 Cannabis in Indiana

References

External links

 

Cannabis in Indiana
Cannabis organizations
National Organization for the Reform of Marijuana Laws
Organizations based in Indiana